Innocent Félix Awoa Zoa  (born June 26, 1988) is a Cameroonian footballer currently playing for CS Chênois. He is a defender.

Honors
Al-Shorta
Iraqi Premier League: 2012–13

References

External links

1985 births
Living people
Cameroonian footballers
FC Dinamo București players
Al-Shorta SC players
Expatriate footballers in Romania
Cameroonian expatriate sportspeople in Romania
Expatriate footballers in Egypt
Cameroonian expatriate sportspeople in Egypt
Expatriate footballers in Iraq
Cameroonian expatriate sportspeople in Iraq
Cameroonian expatriate footballers
Liga II players
Association football defenders
Footballers from Yaoundé